The surname Palin is a name of British origin, either English or Welsh. Possible derivations include an anglicization of the Welsh patronymic ap Heilyn ("son of Heilyn") or a reference to the English placenames Poling, West Sussex or Sea Palling, Norfolk. Independently of this, Palin also is a Swedish language surname that occurs in Sweden and Finland.

People with this name include:
 Brett Palin (born 1984), Canadian hockey player
 Christian Palin (born 1978), Uruguayan singer
 Harold Palin (1916–1990), British rugby league footballer
 John Palin (politician) (1870–1934), British politician
 John Palin (sport shooter) (born 1934), British former sports shooter
 Leigh Palin (born 1965), English footballer
 Leo Palin (born 1956), Finnish tennis player
 Michael Palin (born 1943), British actor, comedian (member of Monty Python) and writer
 Robert Palin (1835–1861), Australian criminal
 Sarah Palin (born 1964), former governor of Alaska and 2008 U.S. Republican vice-presidential nominee
 Todd Palin (born 1964), American snowmobile racer and former husband of Sarah Palin
 Bristol Palin (born 1990), daughter of Todd and Sarah Palin
 Tom Palin (born 1974), English painter, writer and educator

See also 
 Palín (disambiguation)
 Palin (throne)
 Palin, Arunachal Pradesh, a town in the Kurung Kumey district in north east India
 Palin Report 1920, an inquiry examining the rioting in Jerusalem in April 1920
 Paling
 Pallin